A Reason for Living is a various artists compilation album released on cassette tape and fifty-seven minute VHS in 1990 by Santa Cruz Skateboards. "Cockeyed Motherfucker" was also released on From the Machine by Index Productions and later on Diatribe debut EP Therapy in 1991.

Track listing

Personnel
Adapted from the A Reason for Living liner notes.

 Bill Darm – engineering
 Steve Keenan – photography
 John Munnerlyn – design
 Rich Novak – executive-production
 Gavin O'Brien – compiling
 Dolly Phillips – design
 Ray Stevens II – production, compiling
 Miki Vuckovich – photography

Release history

References

External links 
 A Reason for Living at Discogs (list of releases)

1990 compilation albums
1990 video albums